Johannes "Hannes" Bauer (22 July 1954 – 6 May 2016) was a German trombonist of improvised music and free jazz. He was the brother of the trombonist Conny Bauer.

He was born in Halle. From 1979 onwards, he worked as a freelance musician in Berlin.

Among others, he worked with the following groups: the Manfred Schulze Wind Quintet, Doppelmoppel (with Conny Bauer, Uwe Kropinski, and Helmut "Joe" Sachse), Slawterhaus (with Jon Rose, Peter Hollinger, and Dietmar Diesner), Futch (with Thomas Lehn and Jon Rose), Ken Vandermark Territory Band, and the Peter Brötzmann Tentet.

Bauer died on 6 May 2016 at the age of 61.

References

External links 

 homepage Hannes Bauer
  Selected discography
 FMP discography

1954 births
2016 deaths
Free jazz trombonists
German jazz trombonists
Male trombonists
People from Halle (Saale)
German male jazz musicians
Globe Unity Orchestra members
Intakt Records artists
FMP/Free Music Production artists